French Without Tears is a 1936 play

French Without Tears can also refer to:

 French Without Tears (film) a 1940 film, based on the play
 The title of several language education courses for teaching of the French language to English-speakers